Engin Ardıç (born 1 February 1952) is a Turkish writer and a newspaper columnist for the Sabah newspaper.  He also worked as a television commentator in the 1990s.

Biography

Ardıç was born on 1 February 1952 in Trabzon, a coastal city on the northern Black Sea shores of Anatolia. After movıng to Istanbul at a very early age due to his parents' jobs, he spent his childhood mostly in Beşiktaş. In 1959, he was admitted to the elementary section of Galatasaray High School.

Following his graduation from Galatasaray High School, Ardıç entered Boğaziçi University and graduated from there with a degree in political sciences. Due to his interest in theater, his first writings in the early 1970s were mostly theater reviews for the magazine "Tiyatro" (Theater). He also wrote literary critiques in Yeni Dergi (New Magazine), Politika (Politics) and the Cumhuriyet (The Republic) newspaper.  He is currently a columnist in the Sabah newspaper.

His writing style often contains street slang. He has at times been accused of being a misogynist and of promoting hate speech, charges which he has vehemently denied.

Bibliography

 "Doğru Söyleyeni Dokuz Köyden..." (1988)
 "Kadın Suretleri" (1989)
 "İslâm Teksas'ta" (1989)
 "Şengül Hamamı" (1989)
 "Mustafa Kemal Sizin Gibi Kıro Değildi!" (1990)
 "Daktilo Konçertoları" (1990)
 "Turkobarok" (1991)
 "Teğel Teğel Hüzün" (1991)
 "Burjuvazi Şeyediyor Haa..." (1999)

References

 Biyografi.net – Engin Ardıç
 Ansiklopedik Turkcebilgi.com – Engin Ardıç

1952 births
Living people
Galatasaray High School alumni
People from Trabzon
Turkish journalists
Cumhuriyet people
Sabah (newspaper) people